Margaret Satupai (born 9 July 1992) is a Samoan athlete, who holds the Samoan records in shotput and discus and won a bronze medal for shot put in the 2010 Commonwealth Games.

Biography 
Tasele Margaret Iva Satupai was born on 9 July 1992. She grew up in Melbourne where she trained with Oakleigh Little Athletics. She began her international career with an unsuccessful performance at the Junior World Championships in Bydgoszcz in 2008. A year later she was fourth in the discus throw and second in the shot put at the Junior World Championships. She achieved great success in 2010. She achieved high positions at the Junior World Championships and won two medals in the Australian and Oceania Championships. At the end of the season 2010 she was third in the shot put at the Commonwealth Games, winning a bronze medal.

International achievements
During her career she repeatedly improved Samoan records across age categories and, as of 2021, both her discus and shot put distances were still unbeaten. Her record-breaking shot put throw of 16.43m was made at the Commonwealth Games in 2010; her discus throw of 52.67m was made at the Australian Junior Championships in 2011.

References

External links 

 Margaret Satupai - Australian Junior Championships

Samoan female discus throwers
Samoan female shot putters
1992 births
Living people
Commonwealth Games bronze medallists for Samoa
Commonwealth Games medallists in athletics
Athletes (track and field) at the 2010 Commonwealth Games
Medallists at the 2010 Commonwealth Games